Sharjah Science Museum is a science museum in Sharjah, United Arab Emirates.

The museum opened on 17 April 1996. It includes over 50 interactive exhibits. The museum is overseen by the Sharjah Museums Authority.

References

External links
 Museum website
 Sharjah Science Museum | Family-Friendly science museum on YouTube
 Sharjah Science Museum virtual tour UAE | SAMGI TV on YouTube

1996 establishments in the United Arab Emirates
Museums established in 1996
Science museums in the United Arab Emirates
Museums in Sharjah (city)